Sigurd Rushfeldt (born 11 December 1972) is a Norwegian football coach and former player who works as an assistant coach for Tromsø. During his playing career, he played for Tromsø, Birmingham City, Rosenborg, Racing de Santander, and Austria Wien. As a forward, he is well known for his strength and for being a prolific goalscorer. Rushfeldt is the all-time top goal scorer of Eliteserien.

Rushfeldt scored 246 league goals in his career, including a record 172 in Eliteserien.

Club career

Early career and Tromsø
Rushfeldt was born in Vadsø, where he started his career in Vadsø Turn and Norild. He was noticed by Tromsø, which signed him in 1992. In Tromsø Rushfeldt got a reputation of being a prolific goalscorer. This sparked interest from other clubs, and in 1995 he went on an unsuccessful loan spell with Birmingham where he scored just once in the League Cup against Tranmere Rovers. It was not until the end of the 1996 season that Rushfeldt would move on. He then signed for Rosenborg, but not before playing in the cup final that would be Rushfeldt's last match for Tromsø in his first spell with the club. Rushfeldt scored Tromsø's second goal in the cup final securing a 2–1 win over rivals Bodø/Glimt.

Rosenborg and move abroad
With Rosenborg, Rushfeldt had great success. He won the Norwegian Premier League 4 times, he won the cup once more and also became topscorer of the Norwegian Premier League twice. The last time he won the Norwegian Premier League with Rosenborg in 2001, he was loaned in from Racing de Santander which he had transferred to in 1999. His spell with Santander was not a great success and in 2001 Rushfeldt moved on again, this time to Austria Wien. In Vienna he had success and won the league with Austria in 2003 and 2006 and was voted player of the year in the Austrian league 2004/2005. In 2003, 2005 and 2006 he also won the cup with Austria Wien. He scored 3 goals in these finals.

Return to Tromsø
He returned to Tromsø, which he had left in 1996, in July 2006. When his contract with Austria Wien was nearing an end Rushfeldt declared that he wanted to end his career in Norway. Several Norwegian clubs were interested in signing him. He chose to return to Tromsø declaring that he felt drawn to the north, and that he wanted to follow his heart and therefore it had to be Tromsø. In Tromsø, he was again paired up in front with former team-mate Ole Martin Årst, who also played in the 1996 cup final and had enjoyed a career as a professional player outside of Norway before he returned to Tromsø some years earlier. This partnership ended in July 2007, when Årst was sold. Rushfeldt has built up a new partnership upfront with Morten Moldskred. In November 2007 Rushfeldt was selected to be in the Norwegian Premier league team of the year by a group of Norwegian newspapers, stating that he is invaluable as a target man.

Rushfeldt signed a new contract with Tromsø before the 2009 season, a one-year extension that would see him take on the role of coach as well. He came off to a good start, scoring 5 goals in 4 appearances, including a brace away against SK Brann, a match that Tromsø went on to win 4–2.

Rushfeldt became the all-time top scorer of the Norwegian Tippeligaen on 29 May 2011, the day 19 years after his first goal there. In a home match against SK Brann he scored in the first half, equaling Harald Brattbakk's record 166 goals. In the second half, he scored two more goals, completing a perfect hat-trick.

Rushfeldt's last appearance as a professional football player came against IK Start in 2011. He helped his team to finishing runner-up in the league, equalling Tromsø's best ever season, 1990, when they also finished runners-up.

Rushfeldt was given a testimonial match which was played at Alfheim Stadion on 2 June 2012. The match was played between two teams mostly made up of players he had played with during his career at Tromsø, Rosenborg. and Austria Wien, divided into a "Tromsø All Stars" and a "Rosenborg All Stars" team. Rushfeldt played the first half for Tromsø and most of the second half for Rosenborg, scoring once for each team. The match ended in a 6–4 victory for the Rosenborg team.

Comeback with Lyngen/Karnes
In May 2014, Rushfeldt announced that he would play for Lyngen/Karnes IL in the Norwegian fourth division (level 5 on the Norwegian football pyramid). In his debut for his new club, he scored twice. Rushfeldt will continue living in Tromsø and occasionally play for Lyngen/Karnes (in neighboring Lyngen) when his schedule permits it.

International career
In 1994, he surprisingly got a place in Egil Olsen's squad for the 1994 World Cup in USA playing in one game, but Rushfeldt never established himself as a regular having only won a total of 7 caps by 2001, and he did not score his first goal until 2002 in a game against Japan. In 2006, he announced his decision to retire from the national team. However, in 2007 he reconsidered his decision and agreed with the national team coach Åge Hareide that he would make himself available for the game against Bosnia because John Carew was unavailable due to injury. He came on as a substitute in the game against Bosnia, making his first national team appearance in 2 years. Norway failed to qualify for the European Championship and he retired for good from the national team. He ended his international career playing 38 games scoring 7 goals.

Coaching career
In October 2013, Rushfeldt was appointed the assistant coach of Tromsø, after Steinar Nilsen  replaced Agnar Christensen as head coach of the club.

Career statistics

Club

International goals
Scores and results list Norway's goal tally first, score column indicates score after each Rushfeldt goal.

Honours
Tromsø
Norwegian Cup: 1996

Rosenborg
Tippeligaen: 1997, 1998, 1999
Norwegian Cup: 1999

Austria Wien
Austrian Bundesliga: 2002–03, 2005–06
Austrian Cup: 2002–03, 2004–05, 2005–06

Individual
 Tippeligaen top scorer: 1997, 1998
 Knicksen Striker of the Year: 1998
 Austria Wien Player of the Season: 2003–04
 Kniksen's Honour Award: 2011
 Tippeligaen all-time top scorer: 172 goals

References

External links
 

1972 births
Living people
People from Vadsø
Norwegian footballers
Association football forwards
Norway international footballers
Norway under-21 international footballers
1994 FIFA World Cup players
Tromsø IL players
Birmingham City F.C. players
Rosenborg BK players
Racing de Santander players
FK Austria Wien players
Eliteserien players
English Football League players
La Liga players
Austrian Football Bundesliga players
Kniksen Award winners
Tromsø IL non-playing staff
Norwegian expatriate footballers
Expatriate footballers in England
Expatriate footballers in Spain
Expatriate footballers in Austria
Norwegian expatriate sportspeople in England
Norwegian expatriate sportspeople in Spain
Norwegian expatriate sportspeople in Austria
Sportspeople from Troms og Finnmark